"Moonshine" is a song by New Zealand rapper Savage featuring Senegalese-American singer Akon, released in 2005 as the second single from Savage's debut studio album, Moonshine (2005). It was also included on Savage's 2008 album, Savage Island. The song spent seven weeks at the top of the New Zealand singles chart and placed third overall on New Zealand's year-end chart for 2005. In Australia, the song was released on 7 November 2005 and reached number nine on the ARIA Singles Chart.

Remix and music video
The official remix, the "West Coast Remix", features Akon, Gangsta Rkdd of Boo-Yaa T.R.I.B.E., & Monsta Ganjah of The Regime. A music video was produced to promote the single.

Track listing
New Zealand and Australian CD single
 "Moonshine" (radio edit) – 3:35
 "Moonshine" (instrumental) – 5:02
 "Moonshine" (a cappella) – 4:35

Charts

Weekly charts

Year-end charts

Certifications

References

2005 singles
Akon songs
Number-one singles in New Zealand
Savage (rapper) songs
Songs written by Akon